Hand Drawn Pressing is a vinyl record pressing company located in Addison, Texas. It opened in 2011 as the world's first fully automated record pressing plant.

History 
Starting as Dallas-based record label Hand Drawn Records, Hand Drawn Pressing expanded into record brokering in 2011, simplifying the process for artists and pressing records through another record pressing plant. It eventually became independent from the record label by the name of Hand Drawn Pressing under chief creative officer Dustin Blocker and chief operating officer Alex Cushing in 2014. Acquiring two vinyl record presses in 2016, Hand Drawn Pressing began operations in a packaging warehouse.

Technology 
Hand Drawn Pressing uses the WarmTone press engineered by Canada's Viryl Technologies. Before the introduction of the WarmTone press, all current record pressing facilities used machines exclusively resurfaced from the twentieth century. The resurfaced machines press an average of two records per minute. The WarmTone press averages three records per minute with a smaller percentage for error.

See also 
Record press

Production of phonograph records

References

External links 
 

2011 establishments in Texas
American companies established in 2011
American record labels
Manufacturing companies established in 2011